The SNCF Class BB 9400 was an electric locomotive of the SNCF. It was used to haul L’Aquilon, a high-speed passenger train between Paris, Dijon and Lyon-Perrache. The locomotives were given the nickname "Vespa", as they were very lightweight. They were one of a series of locomotives called the "BB Jacquemin", as they used bogies designed by engineer André Jacquemin. The locomotive itself was designed by noted French railway designer Paul Arzens. In later years they hauled passenger trains on the difficult Béziers–Neussargues line.

The locomotive series was built between 1967 and 1969, numbered 9401 to 9535. They were fitted for multiple unit and push–pull working. Some were modified in the 1980s to work in freight service and reclassified as BB 9600, with sound-proofed cabins and a unified control stand for the operator. All units have been removed from service, with one example kept on display at the Gare de Nîmes.

Notes

9400
9400
1500 V DC locomotives
B-B locomotives
Passenger locomotives